Joanne McLeod is a Canadian figure skating coach. She is the skating director at the Champs International Skating Centre of BC (formerly known as the BC Centre of Excellence). Her current and former students include Emanuel Sandhu, Mira Leung, Kevin Reynolds, Jeremy Ten, Nam Nguyen, and many others. In 2012, McLeod became the first level 5 certified figure skating coach in British Columbia.

McLeod has a dance degree from Grant MacEwan College in Edmonton, Alberta, Canada. She also took classes at York University in Toronto, George Randolf in Toronto, Les Ballet Jazz de Montreal, and Alvin Ailey and Martha Graham in New York.

References

External links

 McLeod at Canadian Ice Sports

Canadian people of Italian descent
Canadian female figure skaters
Canadian sportswomen
Living people
Canadian people of German descent
Year of birth missing (living people)